1951 in the Philippines details events of note that happened in the Philippines in 1951

Incumbents

 President: Elpidio Quirino (Liberal) 
 Vice President: Fernando Lopez (Liberal) 
 Chief Justice:
 Manuel Moran (until March 20)
 Ricardo Paras (starting April 2)
 Congress: 2nd

Events

March
 March 4–11 – The Philippines participates in the first ever Asian Games held in New Delhi, India. With 3 gold medals, the country is ranked 5th in the medal tally and 3rd place in the over-all medal count.
 March 6 – Fort Santiago is declared a National Shrine.

May
 May 12 – Roxas becomes a city in the province of Capiz through Republic Act 603.

August
 August 30 – The Mutual Defense Treaty between Philippines and United States is signed.

September
 September 13 – Signed he Proclamation no.274  which is National Fund and Educational Drive of Philippines Tuberculosis Society

October
 October 8 – Nicasio “Asiong” Salonga, branded as Tondo’s Public Enemy No. 1 and the kingpin of Manila, is killed during a drinking spree when he is shot by Ernesto Reyes, a henchman of Salonga’s rival and also-notorious gang leader Carlos “Totoy Golem” Capistrano.

Unknown
 August – The National Movement for Free Elections (NAMFREL) is established
 Philippines signed treaty of peace with Japan and Pay $800M for the damages of WWII

Holidays

As per Act No. 2711 section 29, issued on March 10, 1917, any legal holiday of fixed date falls on Sunday, the next succeeding day shall be observed as legal holiday. Sundays are also considered legal religious holidays. Bonifacio Day was added through Philippine Legislature Act No. 2946. It was signed by then-Governor General Francis Burton Harrison in 1921. On October 28, 1931, the Act No. 3827 was approved declaring the last Sunday of August as National Heroes Day.

 January 1 – New Year's Day
 February 22 – Legal Holiday
 March 29 – Maundy Thursday
 March 30 – Good Friday
 May 1 – Labor Day
 July 4 – Philippine Republic Day
 August 13  – Legal Holiday
 August 26  – National Heroes Day
 November 22 – Thanksgiving Day
 November 30 – Bonifacio Day
 December 25 – Christmas Day
 December 30 – Rizal Day

Births

 January 28 – Oscar Orbos, Philippine TV Personality

 February 18 – Isabel Preysler, Filipina socialite and television host.
 February 28 – Oscar Moreno, Filipino politician.

 March 10 – Gloria Diaz, Filipino model and actress, Miss Universe 1969
 March 17 – Junix Inocian, Filipino stage, television and film actor (died 2015)

 April 18 – Ricardo Fortaleza, Filipino-Australian Olympic amateur boxer/amateur boxing coach and boxing instructor.
 April 27 – Fredenil Castro, Filipino politician.

 May 4 – Manuel Buising, screenwriter
 May 15 – Benny Abante, Filipino politician and pastor.
 May 22 – Edgardo Labella, Filipino politician (d. 2021)
 May 26 – Bogs Adornado, Filipino basketball player and coach.

 June 4 – Francis Arnaiz, basketball player
 June 29 – Billy Hinsche, musician

 July 1 – Florencio Miraflores, Filipino politician.
 July 10 – Romulo Valles, Archbishop of the Metropolitan Archdiocese of Davao
 July 22 – Marte Samson, Filipino basketball player

 August 3 – Aleem Said Ahmad Basher, Filipino-Muslim Alim, an active Islamic preacher, broadcaster, lecturer and Islamic consultant
 August 10 – Menggie Cobarrubias, Filipino actor (d. 2020)
 August 27 – Jocelyn Bolante, Filipino politician
 August 30 – Jim Paredes, Filipino musician, producer, educator, writer, photographer, television personality, workshop facilitator, and activist

 September 9 – Adelina Barrion, entomologist and geneticist (died 2010)
 September 20 – Roi Vinzon, actor
 September 29 – Mike Enriquez, Filipino radio and television newscaster

 October 3 – Hussin Ututalum Amin, Filipino politician, scholar and current mayor of Jolo
 October 8 – Jimmy Santos, Filipino actor, comedian, TV host and a basketball player.
 October 10 – Boboy Garovillo, member of the APO Hiking Society
 October 14 – Salvador Medialdea, executive secretary
 October 15 – Atoy Co, Filipino basketball player

 November 4 – Eugenio Torre, chess grandmaster 
 November 8 – Basil Valdez, Filipino balladeer.
 November 10 – Lim Eng Beng, Filipino-Chinese professional basketball player (d. 2015)
 November 27 – Danilo Palomer Santiago, Filipino Eclectic painter, professor and Department Chair of University of Santo Tomas - College of Fine Arts and Design (UST-CFAD)
 November 30 – Jessup Bahinting, Filipino pilot

 December 1 – Philip Cezar, Filipino professional basketball player
 December 22 – Joey Lina, Filipino Politician

Unknown
 Marissa Delgado, actress

Deaths
 June 1 – José Alejandrino, Filipino general and senator (b. 1870)
 June 6 – Tomás Confesor, Filipino politician and governor of Iloilo (b. 1891)
 June 21 – Juan Cailles, Filipino commander (b. 1871)
 July 15 – Florentino Collantes, Filipino poet (b. 1896)
 October 8 – Asiong Salonga, Filipino gangster (b. 1924)
 October 23 – Fernando Poe, Sr. Filipino actor (b. 1916)

Unknown
Guillermo Capadocia, Filipino politician and labour leader

References